Royal Prussian Jagdstaffel 52, commonly abbreviated to Jasta 52, was a "hunting group" (i.e., fighter squadron) of the Luftstreitkräfte, the air arm of the Imperial German Army during World War I. The squadron would score over 42 aerial victories during the war. The unit's victories came at the expense of eight killed in action, one injured in a flying accident, one wounded in action, and one taken prisoner of war.

History
Jasta 52 was founded at Flieger-Abteilung (Flier Detachment) 7, at Braunschweig, Germany on 27 December 1917. It became operational on 9 January 1918. On 14 January, it was moved to support 6 Armee. The new squadron flew its first combat missions 30 January. Paul Billik would score the unit's first aerial victories on 9 March 1918, and would go on to score about half his squadron's total. Jasta 52 would support 6 Armee for the remainder of the war.

Commanding officers (Staffelführer)
 Leutnant Paul Billik: 27 December 1917 - 10 August 1918
 Oberleutnant Berendonck: 10 August 1918 - November 1918

Duty stations
 Pecq, Belgium: 14 January 1918
 Bersée, France
 Provin, France
 Gondecourt, France
 Auchy, France
 Tourpes, Belgium
 Hove, Belgium

Notable personnel
 Paul Billik
 Hermann Juhnke

References

Bibliography
 

52
Military units and formations established in 1917
1917 establishments in Germany
Military units and formations disestablished in 1918